The Public Policy Forum (PPF) is an independent, non-profit Canadian think tank for public-private dialogue. The organization's stated aim is "to serve as a neutral, independent forum for open dialogue on public policy."

The Forum was founded in 1987 by Shelly (Sheldon) Ehrenworth, Geoff Poapst and a group of public and private sector leaders. The inaugural board meeting took place in Toronto where members endorsed what became the Forum's credo: that the business of government is too important to leave in the hands of government alone.

In its early years, the Forum brought together leaders from business, the trade union movement, academe and the not-for-profit sector for meetings in cities across Canada. The idea was to share perspectives on public sector management questions and discuss ways to build a more collaborative approach to policy making.

The PPF has grown to more than 200 members from business, federal and provincial governments, academia, organized labour and the voluntary and not-for-profit sectors.

Its current President and CEO is Edward Greenspon.

Activities
The PPF functions primarily as an independent, non-partisan facilitator of multi-sector dialogue.

Convening
In conjunction with members and partners from all sectors, the PPF convenes dialogues aimed at producing actionable outcomes in key policy areas, such as: innovation, public engagement, public service and governance.

Research
The PPF regularly produces and publishes research and reports in areas related to its policy dialogues. The Forum also conducts original research in areas such as public service innovation, government leadership, and media.

Annual Events & Awards
Throughout the year the PPF hosts gatherings of senior leadership from all sectors to celebrate excellence in public policy leadership. Four events run annually across Canada:
 The Testimonial Dinner (Toronto, April)
 The Gordon Osbaldeston Lecture (Ottawa, November)
 The Western Dinner
 Atlantic Dinner & Awards
Since 1988 the Testimonial Dinner Awards pay tribute to distinguished Canadians who have made an outstanding contribution to the quality of public policy and public management. As of 1992 the Hyman Solomon Award is giving to an outstanding journalist and in 2005 the Emerging Leaders Award was introduced. These Testimonial Dinner Awards are adjudicated by the PPF, based upon submissions by member organizations.

References

External links

Non-profit organizations based in Alberta
Organizations established in 1987
Political and economic think tanks based in Canada